Narran River, a watercourse of the Barwon catchment within the Murray–Darling basin, is located in the Southern Downs district of Queensland and Orana district of New South Wales, Australia.

The river rises south west of Dirranbandi, as a branch of the Balonne River in Queensland, and flows generally to the south and south-west, before reaching its mouth at Narran Lake, between Brewarrina and Walgett in New South Wales; descending  over its  course.

In March 2010 the Narran River flooded the Angledool Lake at Angledool and then spilled into Weetalabah Creek, crossing the Castlereagh Highway, filling Coocoran Lake near Lightning Ridge.

See also

 Rivers of Queensland
 Rivers of New South Wales
 List of rivers of Australia

References

Rivers of New South Wales
Rivers of Queensland
Murray-Darling basin
Distributaries